Argyle is a rural municipality in the province of Manitoba in Western Canada. It was incorporated on 15 August 1881 and is named after John Campbell, 9th Duke of Argyll who was the fourth Governor General of Canada.

Baldur is the largest community in the municipality, which is in southwestern Manitoba between Brandon and Portage la Prairie.

Communities
 Baldur
 Glenora
 Greenway
 Neelin

Demographics 

References 

 Manitoba Historical Society - Rural Municipality of Argyle
 Map of Argyle R.M. at Statcan
 Baldur - R.M. Profile

External links 

Argyle
1881 establishments in Canada